Betws-y-Coed Urban District was a former district in Caernarfonshire in existence 1894-1974 when it was replaced by the District of Aberconwy.

References

Urban districts of Wales
History of Conwy County Borough